Steinunn Valdís Óskarsdóttir (born 7 April 1965) is an Icelandic politician, and a former mayor of Reykjavík. She was the mayor from 30 November 2004 to 13 June 2006; took over after Þórólfur Árnason resignation. Steinunn is a member of The Social Democratic Alliance. She was a member of and later also the deputy speaker of the Alþingi until her resignation in 2010.

References

External links
 Official Site at Alþingi
 Official Site at the Council of Europe

Living people
1965 births
Steinunn Valdis Oskarsdottir
Steinunn Valdis Oskarsdottir
Steinunn Valdis Oskarsdottir